The 2019 Woking Borough Council election took place on 2 May 2019 to elect one third of members to Woking Borough Council in England coinciding with other local elections held across much of England. Elections in each ward are held in three years out of four. The previous election was held in 2018 and the next election was due to be held in 2020 but was instead deferred to 2021 along with all other ‘2020’ local elections due to the COVID-19 pandemic.

Results Summary
Shortly before these elections, in April 2019, Cllr. Graham Chrystie (a councillor for Pyrford ward) defected from the Conservatives to the Liberal Democrats, leaving the ruling Conservative administration going into these elections with exactly half - 15 out of 30 - of the seats on the council.

Although the Conservatives lost their overall majority on the council, following the election they continued to run the council as a minority administration. In the numerical analysis below (the Results Summary and the individual Results by Ward) the performance of each Party or candidate is compared against the results of the Woking Borough Council (WBC) elections of the previous year of 2018. However, in terms of individual wards ‘held’ or ‘gained’ in 2019 the comparison is with the winning second placed candidates/Parties in the all-out WBC elections of 2016, as these were the sitting councillors seeking re-election in 2019.

|- style="background-color:#F6F6F6"
! colspan="8" style="text-align: right; margin-right: 0.5em" | Turnout
| style="text-align: right; margin-right: 0.5em" | 27,884
| style="text-align: right; margin-right: 0.5em" | 
| style="text-align: right; margin-right: 0.5em" | —
|-

Results by Ward

Byfleet and West Byfleet

Canalside

Goldsworth Park

Heathlands

Hoe Valley

Horsell

Knaphill

Mount Hermon

Pyrford

St John's

References 

Woking
Woking Borough Council elections